Mount Ararat is a snow-capped and dormant compound volcano in the extreme east of Turkey. It consists of two major volcanic cones: Greater Ararat and Little Ararat. The first recorded efforts to reach Ararat's summit were made in the Middle Ages, and Friedrich Parrot, Khachatur Abovian, and four others made the first recorded ascent in 1829.

In Europe, the mountain has been called by the name Ararat since the Middle Ages, as it began to be identified with "mountains of Ararat" described in the Bible as the resting place of Noah's Ark, despite contention that  does not refer specifically to a Mount Ararat. 

Despite lying outside the borders of modern Armenia, the mountain is the principal national symbol of Armenia and has been considered a sacred mountain by Armenians. It is featured prominently in Armenian literature and art and is an icon for Armenian irredentism. It is depicted on the coat of arms of Armenia along with Noah's Ark.

Political borders 
Mount Ararat forms a near-quadripoint between Turkey, Armenia, Iran, and the Nakhchivan exclave of Azerbaijan.

From the 16th century until 1828 the range was part of the Ottoman-Persian border; Great Ararat's summit and the northern slopes, along with the eastern slopes of Little Ararat were controlled by Persia. Following the 1826–28 Russo-Persian War and the Treaty of Turkmenchay, the Persian controlled territory was ceded to the Russian Empire. Little Ararat became the point where the Turkish, Persian, and Russian imperial frontiers converged. The current international boundaries were formed throughout the 20th century. The mountain came under Turkish control during the 1920 Turkish–Armenian War. It formally became part of Turkey according to the 1921 Treaty of Moscow and Treaty of Kars. In the late 1920s, Turkey crossed the Iranian border and occupied the eastern flank of Lesser Ararat as part of its effort to quash the Kurdish Ararat rebellion, during which the Kurdish rebels used the area as a safe haven against the Turkish state. Iran eventually agreed to cede the area to Turkey in a territorial exchange. The Iran-Turkey boundary skirts east of Lesser Ararat, the lower peak of the Ararat massif.

 the mountain is open to climbers only with "military permission". The procedure to obtain the permission involves submitting a formal request to a Turkish embassy for a special "Ararat visa", and it is mandatory to hire an official guide from the Turkish Federation for Alpinism. Access is still limited, even for climbers who obtain the necessary permission, and those who venture off the approved path may be fired upon without warning.

Names and etymology

Ararat
Ararat (Western Armenian pronunciation: Ararad) is the Biblical Hebrew name (אררט ʾrrṭ; Tiberian vocalization אֲרָרָט ʾărārāṭ; Pesher Genesis הוררט hōrārāṭ), cognate with Assyrian Urartu, of a kingdom that existed in the Armenian Highlands in the 9th–6th centuries BC. 

In the 19th century Wilhelm Gesenius speculated an origin from Arjanwartah, an unattested Sanskrit word without any clear cognates, supposedly meaning "holy ground." Some Armenian historians, such as Ashot Melkonyan, link the origin of the word "Ararat" to the prefix of a number of placenames in the Armenian Highland ("ar–"), including the Armenians. The mountain is known as Ararat in European languages, however, none of the native peoples have traditionally referred to the mountain by that name. This mountain was not called by the name Ararat until the Middle Ages; early Armenian historians considered the biblical Ararat to be in Corduene.

Masis
The traditional Armenian name is Masis (Մասիս ; sometimes Massis). However, nowadays, the terms Masis and Ararat are both widely, often interchangeably, used in Armenian. The folk etymology expressed in Movses Khorenatsi's History of Armenia derives the name from king Amasya, the great-grandson of the legendary Armenian patriarch Hayk, who is said to have called the mountain Masis after himself. 

Various etymologies have been proposed. Russian orientalist Anatoly Novoseltsev suggested that Masis derives from Middle Persian masist, "the largest." According to Armenian historian Sargis Petrosyan the mas root in Masis means "mountain", cf. Proto-Indo-European *mņs-. According to archaeologist Armen Petrosyan, the name originates from the Māšu (Mashu) mountain mentioned in the Epic of Gilgamesh, which sounded like Māsu in Assyrian. According to this theory, the name meant "twin," referring to the twin peaks of the mountain. Erkuahi, a land mentioned in Urartian texts and identified with Mt. Ararat, could reflect the native Armenian-language form of this same name (compare to Armenian erku (երկու, meaning "two")).

Today, both Ararat and Masis are common male first names among Armenians.

Ağrı and Agirî
The Turkish name is Ağrı Dağı (Ağır Dağ), i.e. "Mountain of Ağrı". Ağrı literally translates to "pain" or "sorrow". This name has been known since the late Middle Ages. The 17th century explorer Evliya Çelebi referred to it as Ağrî in the Seyahatnâme.

The Kurdish name of the mountain is Çiyayê Agirî , which translates to "fiery mountain". An alternative Kurdish name is Grîdax, which is composed of the word grî, presumably a corrupted version of the Kurdish girê, meaning hill, or Agirî, and dax, which is the Turkish dağ, meaning mountain.

Despite the supposed meaning in Turkish Ağrı Dağı as "pain mountain" and Kurdish Çiyayê Agirî as "fiery mountain", some linguists underline a relationship between the mountain's name and a village on its slopes called Ağori that was decimated after a landslide in 1840. The exact meaning of these related names remains unknown.

Other names

In classical antiquity, particularly in Strabo's Geographica, the peaks of Ararat were known in ancient Greek as Ἄβος (Abos) and Νίβαρος (Nibaros).

Geography
Mount Ararat is located in the Eastern Anatolia Region of Turkey between the provinces of Ağrı and Iğdır, near the border with Iran, Armenia and Nakhchivan exclave of Azerbaijan, between the Aras and Murat rivers. The Serdarbulak lava plateau, at 2600 meters of elevation, separates the peaks of Greater and Little Ararat. The Ararat plain runs along its northwest to western side.

Elevation
Ararat is the third most prominent mountain in West Asia.

The current elevation may be as low as  due to the melting of its snow-covered ice cap.

Summit ice cap

The ice cap on the summit of Mount Ararat has been shrinking since at least 1957.
 on its south-facing slope. Using pre-existing aerial imagery and remote sensing data, Sarıkaya and others studied the extent of the ice cap on Mount Ararat between 1976 and 2011. This rate is consistent with the general rates of retreat of other Turkish summit glaciers and ice caps that have been documented by other studies. According to a 2020 study by Yalcin, "if the glacial withdrawals continue with the same acceleration, the permanent glacier will likely turn into a temporary glacier by 2065."

However, he observed a lack of any clear evidence of prehistoric moraines other than those which were close to the 1958 glacier tongues. Blumenthal explained the absence of such moraines by the lack of confining ridges to control glaciers, insufficient debris load in the ice to form moraines, and their burial by later eruptions. He also found two morainal deposits that were created by a Mount Ararat valley glacier of Pleistocene, possibly Wisconsinan (Last Glacial Maximum) age, downvalley from Lake Balık. It is suspected that Lake Balık occupies a glacial basin.

Geology 
Mount Ararat is a polygenic, compound stratovolcano.

Mount Ararat consists of two distinct volcanic cones, Greater Ararat and Lesser Ararat (Little Ararat). The western volcanic cone, Greater Ararat, is a steep-sided volcanic cone that is larger and higher than the eastern volcanic cone. This crack is the surface expression of an extensional fault. Numerous parasitic cones and lava domes have been built by flank eruptions along this fault and on the flanks of both of the main volcanic cones.

Mount Ararat lies within a complex, sinistral pull-apart basin that originally was a single, continuous depression. The growth of Mount Ararat partitioned this depression into two smaller basins, the Iğdir and Doğubeyazıt basins. This pull-apart basin is the result of strike-slip movement along two en-echelon fault segments, the Doğubeyazıt–Gürbulak and Iğdir Faults, of a sinistral strike–slip fault system. Tension between these faults not only formed the original pull-apart basin, but created a system of faults, exhibiting a horsetail splay pattern, that control the position of the principal volcanic eruption centers of Mount Ararat and associated linear belt of parasitic volcanic cones. The strike-slip fault system within which Mount Ararat is located is the result of north–south convergence and tectonic compression between the Arabian Platform and Laurasia that continued after the Tethys Ocean closed during the Eocene epoch along the Bitlis–Zagros suture.

Geological history 

During the early Eocene and early Miocene, the collision of the Arabian platform with Laurasia closed and eliminated the Tethys Ocean from the area of what is now Anatolia. The closure of these masses of continental crust collapsed this ocean basin by middle Eocene and resulted in a progressive shallowing of the remnant seas, until the end of the early Miocene. Post-collisional tectonic convergence within the collision zone resulted in the total elimination of the remaining seas from East Anatolia at the end of early Miocene, crustal shortening and thickening across the collision zone, and uplift of the East Anatolian–Iranian plateau. Accompanying this uplift was extensive deformation by faulting and folding, which resulted in the creation of numerous local basins. The north–south compressional deformation continues today as evidenced by ongoing faulting, volcanism, and seismicity.

Within Anatolia, regional volcanism started in the middle-late Miocene. During the late Miocene–Pliocene period, widespread volcanism blanketed the entire East Anatolian–Iranian plateau under thick volcanic rocks. This volcanic activity has continued uninterrupted until historical times. Apparently, it reached a climax during the latest Miocene–Pliocene, 6 to 3 Ma. During the Quaternary, the volcanism became restricted to a few local volcanoes such as Mount Ararat. These volcanoes are typically associated with north–south tensional fractures formed by the continuing north–south shortening deformation of Anatolia.

In their detailed study and summary of the Quaternary volcanism of Anatolia, Yilmaz et al. recognized four phases to the construction of Mount Ararat from volcanic rocks exposed in glacial valleys deeply carved into its flanks. These volcanic rocks were erupted from approximately north northwest–south southeast-trending extensional faults and fissures prior to the development of Mount Ararat. Second, a cone-building phase began when the volcanic activity became localized at a point along a fissure. Third, during a climatic phase, copious flows of andesitic and basaltic lavas were erupted. During this phase, the current cones of Greater and Lesser Ararat were formed as eruptions along subsidiary fissures and cracks and flank occurred. Finally, the volcanic eruptions at Mount Ararat transitioned into a flank eruption phase, during which a major north–south-trending fault offset the two cones that developed along with a number of subsidiary fissures and cracks on the volcano's flanks. Along this fault and the subsidiary fissures and cracks, a number of parasitic cones and domes were built by minor eruptions. One subsidiary cone erupted voluminous basalt and andesite lava flows. They flowed across the Doğubeyazıt plain and along the southerly flowing Sarısu River. These lava flows formed black ʻaʻā and pāhoehoe lava flows that contain well preserved lava tubes. The radiometric dating of these lava flows yielded radiometric ages of 0.4, 0.48 and 0.81 Ma. Overall, radiometric ages obtained from the volcanic rocks erupted by Mount Ararat range from 1.5 to 0.02 Ma.

Recent volcanic and seismic activity
The chronology of Holocene volcanic activity associated with Mount Ararat is documented by either archaeological excavations, oral history, historical records, or a combination of these data, which provide evidence that volcanic eruptions of Mount Ararat occurred in 2500–2400 BC, 550 BC, possibly in 1450 AD and 1783 AD, and definitely in 1840 AD. Archaeological evidence demonstrates that explosive eruptions and pyroclastic flows from the northwest flank of Mount Ararat destroyed and buried at least one Kura–Araxes culture settlement and caused numerous fatalities in 2500–2400 BC. Oral histories indicated that a significant eruption of uncertain magnitude occurred in 550 BC and minor eruptions of uncertain nature might have occurred in 1450 AD and 1783 AD. According to the interpretation of historical and archaeological data, strong earthquakes not associated with volcanic eruptions also occurred in the area of Mount Ararat in 139, 368, 851–893, and 1319 AD. During the 139 AD earthquake, a large landslide that caused many casualties and was similar to the 1840 AD landslide originated from the summit of Mount Ararat.

1840 eruption
A phreatic eruption occurred on Mount Ararat on July 2, 1840 and pyroclastic flow from radial fissures on the upper north flank of the mountain and a possibly associated earthquake of magnitude 7.4 that caused severe damage and numerous casualties. Up to 10,000 people died in the earthquake, including 1,900 villagers in the village of Akhuri (Armenian: Akori, modern Yenidoğan) who were killed by a gigantic landslide and subsequent debris flow. In addition, this combination of landslide and debris flow destroyed the Armenian monastery of St. Jacob near Akori, the town of Aralik, several villages, and Russian military barracks. It also temporarily dammed the Sevjur (Metsamor) River.

Ascents
The 13th century missionary William of Rubruck wrote that "Many have tried to climb it, but none has been able."

Religious objections
The Armenian Apostolic Church was historically opposed to ascents of Ararat on religious grounds. Thomas Stackhouse, an 18th-century English theologian, noted that "All the Armenians are firmly persuaded that Noah's ark exists to the present day on the summit of Mount Ararat, and that in order to preserve it, no person is permitted to approach it." In response to its first ascent by Parrot and Abovian, one high-ranking Armenian Apostolic Church clergyman commented that to climb the sacred mountain was "to tie the womb of the mother of all mankind in a dragonish mode." By contrast, in the 21st century to climb Ararat is "the most highly valued goal of some of the patriotic pilgrimages that are organized in growing number from Armenia and the Armenian diaspora."

First ascent

The Baltic German naturalist Friedrich Parrot of the University of Dorpat arrived at Etchmiadzin in mid-September 1829, almost two years after the Russian capture of Yerevan, for the sole purpose of exploring Ararat. The prominent Armenian writer Khachatur Abovian, then a deacon and translator at Etchmiadzin, was assigned by Catholicos Yeprem, the head of the Armenian Church, as interpreter and guide.

After two failed attempts, they reached the summit on their third attempt at 3:15 p.m. on October 9, 1829. The group included Parrot, Abovian, two Russian soldiers – Aleksei Zdorovenko and Matvei Chalpanov – and two Armenian Akhuri villagers – Hovhannes Aivazian and Murad Poghosian. Parrot measured the elevation at  using a mercury barometer. This was not only the first recorded ascent of Ararat, but also the second highest elevation climbed by man up to that date outside of Mount Licancabur in the Chilean Andes. Abovian dug a hole in the ice and erected a wooden cross facing north. Abovian also picked up a chunk of ice from the summit and carried it down with him in a bottle, considering the water holy. On , Parrot and Abovian together with the Akhuri hunter Sahak's brother Hako, acting as a guide, climbed up Lesser Ararat.

Later notable ascents

Other early notable climbers of Ararat included Russian climatologist and meteorologist Kozma Spassky-Avtonomov (August 1834), Karl Behrens (1835), German mineralogist and geologist Otto Wilhelm Hermann von Abich (29 July 1845), British politician Henry Danby Seymour (1848) and British army officer Major Robert Stuart (1856). Later in the 19th century, two British politicians and scholars—James Bryce (1876) and H. F. B. Lynch (1893)—climbed the mountain. The first winter climb was by Turkish alpinist Bozkurt Ergör, the former president of the Turkish Mountaineering Federation, who climbed the peak on 21 February 1970.

Resting place of Noah's Ark

Origin of the tradition
According to the Book of Genesis of the Old Testament, Noah's Ark landed on the "mountains of Ararat" (Biblical , hare ararat). Many historians and Bible scholars agree that "Ararat" is the Hebrew name of Urartu, the geographical predecessor of Armenia; they argue that the word referred to the wider region at the time and not specifically to Mount Ararat. The phrase is translated as "mountains of Armenia" (montes Armeniae) in the Vulgate, the fourth century Latin translation of the Bible. Nevertheless, Mount Ararat is traditionally considered the resting place of Noah's Ark, and, thus, considered a biblical mountain.

Mount Ararat has been associated with the Genesis account since the 11th century, and Armenians began to identify it as the ark's landing place during that time. F. C. Conybeare wrote that the mountain was "a center and focus of pagan myths and cults… and it was only in the eleventh century, after these had vanished from the popular mind, that the Armenian theologians ventured to locate on its eternal snows the resting-place of Noah's ark." Franciscan missionary William of Rubruck is usually considered the earliest reference for the tradition of Mount Ararat as the landing place of the ark in European literature. English traveler John Mandeville is another early author who mentioned Mount Ararat, "where Noah's ship rested, and it is still there."

Prevalence of the tradition

Most Christians identify Mount Ararat with the biblical "mountains of Ararat" "largely because it would have been the first peak to emerge from the receding flood waters", and it is where most of Western Christianity place the landing of Noah's Ark. A 1722 biblical dictionary by Austin Calmet and the 1871 Jamieson-Fausset-Brown Bible Commentary both point to Mount Ararat as the place where the ark rested. American missionary H. G. O. Dwight wrote in 1856 that it is "the general opinion of the learned in Europe" that the Ark landed on Mount Ararat. James Bryce wrote that the ark rested upon a "mountain in the district which the Hebrews knew as Ararat, or Armenia" in an 1878 article for the Royal Geographical Society, and he added that the biblical writer must have had Mount Ararat in mind because it is so "very much higher, more conspicuous, and more majestic than any other summit in Armenia."

In 2001 Pope John Paul II declared in his homily in Yerevan's St. Gregory the Illuminator Cathedral: "We are close to Mount Ararat, where tradition says that the Ark of Noah came to rest." Patriarch Kirill of Moscow, the head of the Russian Orthodox Church, also mentioned Mount Ararat as the resting place of Noah's Ark in his speech at the Etchmiadzin Cathedral during his visit to Armenia in 2010.

Those critical of this view point out that Ararat was the name of the country at the time when Genesis was written, not specifically the mountain. Arnold wrote in his 2008 Genesis commentary, "The location 'on the mountains' of Ararat indicates not a specific mountain by that name, but rather the mountainous region of the land of Ararat."

Searches
Ararat has traditionally been the main focus of the searches for Noah's Ark. Augustin Calmet wrote in his 1722 biblical dictionary, "It is affirmed, but without proof, that there are still remains of Noah's ark on the top of this mountain; but M. de Tournefort, who visited this spot, has assured us there was nothing like it; that the top of mount Ararat is inaccessible, both by reason of its great height, and of the snow which perpetually covers it." Archaeological expeditions, sometimes supported by evangelical and millenarian churches, have been conducted since the 19th century in search of the ark. According to a 1974 book around 200 people from more than 20 countries claimed to have seen the Ark on Ararat since 1856. A fragment from the ark supposedly found on Ararat is on display at the museum of Etchmiadzin Cathedral, the center of the Armenian Church. Despite numerous reports of ark sightings (e.g. Ararat anomaly) and rumors, "no scientific evidence of the ark has emerged."
Searches for Noah's Ark are considered by scholars an example of pseudoarchaeology. Kenneth Feder writes, "As the flood story itself is unsupported by any archaeological evidence, it is not surprising that there is no archaeological evidence for the existence of an impossibly large boat dating to 5,000 years ago."

Significance for Armenians

Symbolism

Despite lying outside the borders of modern Armenia, Ararat has historically been associated with Armenia, and Armenians have being called by some authors the "people of Ararat". It is widely considered the country's principal national symbol and brand. The image of Ararat, usually framed within a nationalizing discourse, is ubiquitous in everyday material culture in Armenia. Tsypylma Darieva argues that Armenians have "a sense of possession of Ararat in the sense of symbolic cultural property." 

There is historical and modern mountain worship around it among Armenians. Ararat is known as the "holy mountain" of the Armenian people. It was principal to the pre-Christian Armenian mythology, where it was the home of the gods. With the rise of Christianity, the mythology associated with pagan worship of the mountain was lost. 

In the early 20th century, the Italian traveler Luigi Villari wrote, "Almost the whole history of the Armenian people centres round Mount Ararat." Ararat was the geographical center of ancient Armenian kingdoms. One scholar defined the historic Greater Armenia (Armenia Major) as "the area about 200 miles [320 km] in every direction from Mount Ararat." In 19th-century era of romantic nationalism, when an Armenian state did not exist, Mount Ararat symbolized the historical Armenian nation-state. In 1861 Armenian poet Mikael Nalbandian, witnessing the Italian unification, wrote to Harutiun Svadjian in a letter from Naples: "Etna and Vesuvius are still smoking; is there no fire left in the old volcano of Ararat?"

Anglican priest and historian Theodore Edward Dowling wrote in 1910 that Mount Ararat and Etchmiadzin are the "two great objects of Armenian veneration." He noted that the "noble snowy mountain takes the place, in the estimation of the Armenians, that Mount Sinai and the traditional Mount Zion do among the adherents of other Eastern Christians." While historian Jon Smele called Mt. Ararat and the medieval capital of Ani the "most cherished symbols of Armenian identity."

Myth of origin
The Genesis flood narrative was linked to the Armenian myth of origin by the early medieval historian Movses Khorenatsi. In his History of Armenia, he wrote that Noah and his family first settled in Armenia and later moved to Babylon. Hayk, a descendant of Japheth, a son of Noah, revolted against Bel (the biblical Nimrod) and returned to the area around Mount Ararat, where he established the roots of the Armenian nation. He is thus considered the legendary founding father and the name giver of the Armenian people. According to Razmik Panossian, this legend "makes Armenia the cradle of all civilisation since Noah's Ark landed on the 'Armenian' mountain of Ararat. […] it connects Armenians to the biblical narrative of human development. […] it makes Mount Ararat the national symbol of all Armenians, and the territory around it the Armenian homeland from time immemorial."

Coat of arms of Armenia
Mount Ararat has been depicted on the coat of arms of Armenia consistently since 1918. The First Republic's coat of arms was designed by architect Alexander Tamanian and painter Hakob Kojoyan. This coat of arms was readopted by the legislature of the Republic of Armenia on April 19, 1992, after Armenia regained independence. Ararat is depicted along with the ark on its peak on the shield on an orange background.

The emblem of the Armenian Soviet Socialist Republic (Soviet Armenia) was created by the painters Martiros Saryan and Hakob Kojoyan in 1921. Mount Ararat is depicted in the center and makes up a large portion of it.

Ararat also appeared on the coat of arms of the Armenian Oblast and the Georgia-Imeretia Governorate (image), subdivisions of the Russian Empire that included the northern flanks of the mountain. They were adopted in 1833 and 1843, respectively.

Symbol of genocide and territorial claims
In the aftermath of the Armenian genocide of 1915, Ararat came to represent the destruction of the native Armenian population of eastern Turkey (Western Armenia) in the national consciousness of Armenians. Ari L. Goldman noted in 1988, "In most Armenian homes in the modern diaspora, there are pictures of Mount Ararat, a bittersweet reminder of the homeland and national aspirations."

Ararat has become a symbol of Armenian efforts to reclaim its "lost lands", i.e. the areas west of Ararat that are now part of Turkey that had significant Armenian population before the genocide. Adriaans noted that Ararat is featured as a sanctified territory for the Armenians in everyday banal irredentism. Stephanie Platz wrote, "Omnipresent, the vision of Ararat rising above Yerevan and its outskirts constantly reminds Armenians of their putative ethnogenesis … and of their exile from Eastern Anatolia after the Armenian genocide of 1915."

Turkish political scientist Bayram Balci argues that regular references to the Armenian Genocide and Mount Ararat "clearly indicate" that the border with Turkey is contested in Armenia. Since independence from the Soviet Union in 1991, the Armenian government has not made official claims to any Turkish territory, however the Armenian government has avoided "an explicit and formal recognition of the existing Turkish-Armenian border." In a 2010 interview with Der Spiegel, Armenian President Serzh Sargsyan was asked whether Armenia wants "Mount Ararat back." Sargsyan, in response, said that "No one can take Mount Ararat from us; we keep it in our hearts. Wherever Armenians live in the world today, you will find a picture of Mount Ararat in their homes. And I feel certain that a time will come when Mount Ararat is no longer a symbol of the separation between our peoples, but an emblem of understanding. But let me make this clear: Never has a representative of Armenia made territorial demands. Turkey alleges this—perhaps out of its own bad conscience?"

The most prominent party to lay claims to eastern Turkey is the nationalist Armenian Revolutionary Federation (Dashnaktsutyun). which claims it as part of what it considers United Armenia. In various settings, several notable individuals such as German historian Tessa Hofmann, Slovak conservative politician František Mikloško, Lithuanian political scientist and Soviet dissident Aleksandras Štromas have spoken in support of Armenian claims over Mt. Ararat.

Cultural depictions

Levon Abrahamian noted that Ararat is visually present for Armenians in reality (it can be seen from many houses in Yerevan and settlements in the Ararat plain), symbolically (through many visual representations, such as on Armenia's coats of arms), and culturally—in numerous and various nostalgic poetical, political, architectural representation. The first three postage stamps issued by Armenia in 1992 after achieving independence from the Soviet Union depicted Mount Ararat.

Mount Ararat has been depicted on various Armenian dram banknotes issued in 1993–2001; on the reverse of the 10 dram banknotes issued in 1993, on the reverse of the 50 dram banknotes issued in 1998, on the obverse of the 100 and 500 dram banknotes issued in 1993, and on the reverse of the 50,000 dram banknotes issued in 2001. It was also depicted on the reverse of the Turkish 100 lira banknotes of 1972–1986.

Ararat is depicted on the logos of two of Armenia's leading universities—the Yerevan State University and the American University of Armenia. It is depicted on the logos of Football Club Ararat Yerevan (since the Soviet times) and the Football Federation of Armenia. The logo of Armavia, Armenia's now defunct flag carrier, also depicted Ararat. The publications of the Social Democrat Hunchakian Party in Lebanon (Ararad daily) and California, U.S. (Massis weekly) are both named for the mountain. The Ararat brandy, produced by the Yerevan Brandy Company since 1887, is considered the most prestigious Eastern European brandy. Hotels in Yerevan often advertise the visibility of Ararat from their rooms, which is seen as a major advantage for tourists.

In visual art
European
Ararat was depicted in the books of European, including many British, travelers in the 18th–19th centuries who visited Armenia. 

Armenian
According to one source, the first Armenian artist to depict the mountain was Ivan Aivazovsky, who created a painting of Ararat during his visit to Armenia in 1868. Other major Armenians artists who painted Ararat include Yeghishe Tadevosyan, Gevorg Bashinjaghian, Martiros Saryan, and Panos Terlemezian.

In literature
Rouben Paul Adalian suggested that "there is probably more poetry written about Mount Ararat than any other mountain on earth." Travel writer Rick Antonson described Ararat as the "most fabled mountain in the world."

Armenian

Mount Ararat is featured prominently in Armenian literature. According to Meliné Karakashian, Armenian poets "attribute to it symbolic meanings of unity, freedom, and independence." According to Kevork Bardakjian, in Armenian literature, Ararat "epitomizes Armenia and Armenian suffering and aspirations, especially the consequences of the 1915 genocide: almost total annihilation, loss of a unique culture and land [...] and an implicit determination never to recognize the new political borders."

The last two lines of Yeghishe Charents's 1920 poem "I Love My Armenia" (Ես իմ անուշ Հայաստանի) read: "And in the entire world you will not find a mountaintop like Ararat's. / Like an unreachable peak of glory I love my Mount Masis." In a 1926 poem dedicated to the mountain Avetik Isahakyan wrote: "Ages as though in second came, / Touched the grey crest of Ararat, / And passed by...! [...] It's now your turn; you too, now, / Stare at its high and lordly brow, / And pass by...!" Mount Ararat is the most frequently cited symbol in the poetry of Hovhannes Shiraz. In collection of poems, Knar Hayastani (Lyre of Armenia) published in 1958, there are many poems "with very strong nationalist overtones, especially with respect to Mount Ararat (in Turkey) and the irredentism it entailed." In one such poem, "Ktak" (Bequest), Shiraz bequeaths his son Mt. Ararat to "keep it forever, / As the language of us Armenians, as the pillar of your father’s home."

The first lines of Paruyr Sevak's 1961 poem "We Are Few..." (Քիչ ենք, բայց հայ ենք) read: "We are few, but they say of us we are Armenians. / We do not think ourselves superior to anyone. / Clearly we shall have to accept / That we, and only we, have an Ararat" In one short poem Silva Kaputikyan compares Armenia to an "ancient rock-carved fortress", the towers of which are Ararat and Aragats.

Non-Armenian
English Romantic poet William Wordsworth imagines seeing the ark in the poem "Sky-prospect — From the Plain of France."

In his Journey to Arzrum (Путешествие в Арзрум; 1835–36), the celebrated Russian poet Aleksandr Pushkin recounted his travels to the Caucasus and Armenia at the time of the 1828–29 Russo-Turkish War.

Russian Symbolist poet Valery Bryusov often referred to Ararat in his poetry and dedicated two poems to the mountain, which were published in 1917.  Bryusov saw Ararat as the embodiment of antiquity of the Armenian people and their culture.

Russian poet Osip Mandelstam wrote fondly of Ararat during his 1933 travels in Armenia. "I have cultivated in myself a sixth sense, an 'Ararat' sense," the poet wrote, "the sense of an attraction to a mountain."

During his travels to Armenia, Soviet Russian writer Vasily Grossman observed Mount Ararat from Yerevan standing "high in the blue sky."  He wrote that "with its gentle, tender contours, it seems to grow not out of the earth but out of the sky, as if it has condensed from its white clouds and its deep blue.  It is this snowy mountain, this bluish-white sunlit mountain that shone in the eyes of those who wrote the Bible."

In The Maximus Poems (1953) American poet Charles Olson, who grew up near the Armenian neighborhood in Worcester, Massachusetts, compares the Ararat Hill near his childhood home to the mountain and "imagines he can capture an Armenian's immigrant perspective: the view of Ararat Hill as Mount Ararat."

The world renowned Turkish-Kurdish writer Yaşar Kemal's 1970 book entitled Ağrı Dağı Efsanesi (The Legend of Mount Ararat) is about a local myth about a poor boy and the governor's daughter.

Several major episodes in Declare (2001) by Tim Powers take place on Mount Ararat. In the book, it is the focal point of supernatural happenings.

In the lore of Warhammer 40,000, Mount Ararat is the site of the destruction of the Thunder Warriors.

In popular culture

In music
"Holy Mountains", the 8th track of the album Hypnotize (2005) by System of a Down, an American rock band composed of four Armenian Americans, "references Mount Ararat [...] and details that the souls lost to the Armenian Genocide have returned to rest here."
"Here's to You Ararat" is a song from the 2006 album How Much is Yours of Arto Tunçboyacıyan's Armenian Navy Band.

In film
The 2002 film Ararat by Armenian-Canadian filmmaker Atom Egoyan features Mount Ararat prominently in its symbolism.
The 2011 documentary film Journey to Ararat on Parrot and Abovian's expedition to Ararat was produced in Estonia by filmmaker Riho Västrik. It was screened at the Golden Apricot International Film Festival in Yerevan in 2013.

Places named for Ararat
In Armenia
In Armenia, four settlements are named after the mountain's two names: Ararat and Masis. All are located in the Ararat Plain. First, the village of Davalu was renamed Ararat in 1935, followed by Tokhanshalu being renamed Masis in 1945, and the workers town of Davalu's nearby cement factory also being renamed Ararat in 1947. The latter became a city in 1962. The railway town of Ulukhanlu was renamed Masis in 1950, while the former village/town of Ulukhanlu, renamed Hrazdan and then Masis in 1969. The two merged to form the urban-type settlement of Masis, the current town, in 1971.
There were previously administrative divisions (shrjan or raion) called Ararat and Masis (called Vedi until 1968), formed in 1930 and 1968, respectively. They became a part of the province (marz) of Ararat in the 1995.
The name is also used in two dioceses of the Armenian Apostolic Church: the Araratian Pontifical Diocese and the Diocese of Masyatsotn, encompassing capital Yerevan and the Ararat province, respectively.

Elsewhere
The Turkish province of Ağrı was named after the Turkish name of the mountain in 1927, while the provincial capital city of Karaköse was renamed to Ağrı in 1946.
In the United States, a river in Virginia and North Carolina was named Ararat after the mountain no later than 1770. An unincorporated community in North Carolina was later named after the river. A township and a mountain in Pennsylvania are called Ararat.
In the Australian state of Victoria, a city was named Ararat in 1840. Its local government area is also called Ararat.
96205 Ararat is an asteroid named in the mountain's honor. It was discovered in 1992 by Freimut Börngen and Lutz D. Schmadel at Tautenburg Observatory in Germany. The name was proposed by Börngen.

States
Besides Ararat being the Hebrew version of Urartu, this Iron Age state is often referred to as the "Araratian Kingdom" or the "Kingdom of Ararat" (Arartyan t’agavorut’yun) in Armenian historiography. Levon Abrahamian argues that this name gives it a "biblical and an Armenian touch."
The First Republic of Armenia, the first modern Armenian state that existed between 1918 and 1920, was sometimes called the Araratian Republic or the Republic of Ararat (Araratyan hanrapetut’yun) as it was centered in the Ararat plain.
In 1927 the Kurdish nationalist party Xoybûn led by Ihsan Nuri, fighting an uprising against the Turkish government, declared the independence of the Republic of Ararat, centered around Mount Ararat.

Gallery

See also
Mount Alvand
Kurdish melodies
Mount Judi

Notes

References

Citations

Sources

General works cited in the article

Specific works on Ararat

Books on Armenia with Ararat in their titles

External links

 
 
 NASA Earth Observatory page

 
Mountains of Turkey
Stratovolcanoes of Turkey
Five-thousanders of the Armenian Highlands
Armenian Highlands
Highest points of countries
Landforms of Iğdır Province
Landforms of Ağrı Province
Mythological mountains
Sacred mountains
National symbols of Armenia
Important Bird Areas of Turkey